Frisco is an unincorporated community in Franklin Township, Beaver County, Pennsylvania, United States. A portion extends north into Perry Township in Lawrence County. It is located along Pennsylvania Route 288, southeast of Ellwood City.  The area was the site of a tube mill during World War I.

Demographics

Further reading
"Frisco Hard to Describe". Milestones, Vol. 14, No. 1. Beaver County Historical Society. 1989.

References

External links 
Clickable map of Beaver County, Pennsylvania (archived)

Unincorporated communities in Beaver County, Pennsylvania
Pittsburgh metropolitan area
Unincorporated communities in Pennsylvania